is the term for the preparation area in a Japanese tea house or attached to any venue used for the Japanese tea ceremony. The term  can also refer to purificatory fonts at shrines and temples, as well as to storage cupboards for use in kitchens. This article, however, focuses on the tea ceremony .

History  

The full development of chadō (the Japanese "Way of Tea") and advent of the independent structure dedicated to and designed for use for this cultural activity is generally attributed to the sixteenth century tea master Sen no Rikyū. With the development of a structure dedicated to receiving guests for this cultural activity, there naturally was the need for a "back room" area for the host to make ready the items to be used for the reception of the guests. Before this, during the early development of the Japanese tea ceremony, corners of large reception rooms were partitioned off for tea-making, and there was no specific area or space designed for the preparations.

Use

As its name suggests, a  provides a location for the performing of tea ceremony-related tasks involving water, such as washing the various utensils and supplies, and boiling extra water for filling and replenishing the pot in the tea room.  A  is also used for the final preparation of wagashi that will be served during a chanoyu function (such as cutting them, arranging them on dishes, and so on); for organizing, preparing, and (in some cases) storing the tea supplies; and, in the case of functions for large groups of people, for quickly preparing many bowls of tea to serve to guests.

Facilities

The most modest modern  may comprise little more than a hot-plate or electric kettle and several buckets of fresh water, and might be located in a screened-off outdoor area with a grass floor.  A fully equipped modern indoor  may rival the best-equipped kitchen, with several sinks with hot and cold running water, an elaborate system of storage areas, cupboards, shelves and worktops, a refrigerator, stove, and microwave oven.  In practice, however, most fall somewhere in between.  

There are manufacturers of such units. Whatever the style and size of this area, it will be kept scrupulously clean and organized, each school having its preferred order of arranging the utensils.

The special  

Some tea rooms may have a special type of built-in recessed  cabinet called . It is built into the wall of the tea room, at floor level, on the side where the host's mat is situated, and has sliding doors so that it can be closed from view of the guests.

According to A. L. Sadler, the name  is taken from the boxes in which strolling puppeteers kept their dolls, and was first borrowed by Sen no Rikyū.   were first placed on the floor, then hung on the wall, and finally built in.

References

External links

 Image of a small built-in mizuya
 Image of built-in mizuya at Doyu-an
 View of the main mizuya at the Urasenke Konnichian historical tea room complex, Kyoto

Chadō
Architecture in Japan
Rooms